Hippisley is a surname. Notable people with the surname include:

John Hippisley (disambiguation), multiple people
Harold Hippisley (1890–1914), English cricketer
Hippisley Baronets